The Royal Army Chaplains' Department (RAChD) is an all-officer department that provides ordained clergy to minister to the British Army.

History

The Army Chaplains' Department (AChD) was formed by Royal Warrant of 23 September 1796; until then chaplains had been part of individual regiments, but not on the central establishment. Only Anglican chaplains were recruited until 1827, when Presbyterians were recognised, but not commissioned until 1858. Roman Catholic chaplains were recruited from 1836, Methodist chaplains from 1881, and Jewish chaplains from 1892. During the First World War some 4,400 Army Chaplains were recruited and 179 lost their lives on active service. The department received the "Royal" prefix in February 1919. During the Second World War another 96 British and 38 Commonwealth Army Chaplains lost their lives.

From 1946 to 1996, the RAChD's Headquarters, Depot and Training Centre were at Bagshot Park in Surrey, now the home of The Duke and Duchess of Edinburgh. In 1996, they moved to the joint service Armed Forces Chaplaincy Centre at Amport House near Andover, Hampshire. Since 2020 the joint centre has been based at Beckett House, part of the Defence Academy of the United Kingdom, just outside Shrivenham, Oxfordshire.

Role
Serving regular chaplains in the British Army can be Catholic, one of several Protestant denominations, or to the Jewish faith. Uniquely within the Army, the Royal Army Chaplains' Department has different cap badges for its Christian and Jewish officers.

Army chaplains, although they are all commissioned officers of the British Army and wear uniform, do not have executive authority. They are unique within the Army in that they do not carry arms. Many chaplains have been decorated for bravery in action, including four awarded Victoria Crosses: James Adams, Noel Mellish, Theodore Hardy and William Addison. At services on formal occasions, chaplains wear their medals and decorations on their clerical robes.

The RAChD's motto is "In this Sign Conquer" as seen in the sky before the Battle of the Milvian Bridge by the Roman  Emperor Constantine. Its regimental march, both quick and slow, is the Prince of Denmark's March, erroneously known as the Trumpet Voluntary.

Museum
The Royal Army Chaplains' Museum is at Shrivenham, in a new building opened by the Countess of Wessex on 17 May 2022. Its newly curated collection replaced the Museum of Army Chaplaincy which was at Amport House near Andover, Hampshire until 2019.

Denominations
Chaplains are either classified as Jewish or as a member of one of the following denominational groups:
Anglican (Church of England, Church of Ireland, Church in Wales and Scottish Episcopal Church)
Assemblies of God
Baptist Union of Great Britain 
Church of Scotland 
Free Church of Scotland
Churches in Communities International
Congregational Federation
Elim Pentecostal Church
Methodist Church
Presbyterian Church in Ireland
Roman Catholic Church
United Reformed Church
Salvation Army

There are also religious advisors from other faiths.

An Army chaplain is expected to minister to and provide pastoral care to any soldier who needs it, no matter their denomination or faith or lack of it.

In 2004, Defence Minister Ivor Caplin said: “It is our aspiration to have armed forces which are representative of UK society as a whole.” The move might also help when dealing with soldiers in other armies from different faiths. At the time there were about 740 personnel that declared themselves to be from the four other main religions, but only Christian chaplains are employed by the MoD. The number of non religious MOD personnel including those in uniform numbered in the tens of thousands.

In 2011, following a freedom of information request on Ministry of Defence spending on chaplaincy, the National Secular Society requested that £22m of spending should come directly from churches while professional counselling should continue to be funded by the taxpayer, in order to better serve the non-religious in the military. The proposal was rejected by the Church of England.

In September 2021 Defence Humanists, through a submission to the Government’s Integrated Review of foreign policy, defence, security and international development, called for an independent review of pastoral support for the armed forces which takes into account the nation’s changing religion and belief demographics and the need for a multi-faith and belief approach. As of 2022 there are no non-religious chaplains in the British armed forces although organisations such as Defence Humanists (previously known as the UK Armed Forces Humanist Association), the Non-Religious Pastoral Support Network and the Defence Secular Society continue to advocate for it. The armed forces of the Netherlands have had Humanist chaplains since 1964, known as Humanist Counseling in the Dutch Armed Forces.

Ranks

Chaplains are the only British Army officers who do not carry standard officer ranks. They are instead designated Chaplain to the Forces (CF) (e.g. "The Reverend John Smith CF"). They do, however, have grades which equate to the standard ranks and wear the insignia of the equivalent rank. Chaplains are usually addressed as "Padre" , never by their nominal military rank.

Chaplain-General (CG) = Major-General
Deputy Chaplain-General (DCG) = Brigadier
Chaplain to the Forces 1st Class (CF1) = Colonel
Chaplain to the Forces 2nd Class (CF2) = Lieutenant-Colonel
Chaplain to the Forces 3rd Class (CF3) = Major
Chaplain to the Forces 4th Class (CF4) = Captain

The senior Church of England chaplain is ranked within the church hierarchy as an archdeacon – he or she holds the appointment of Archdeacon for the Army whether or not he or she is also the Chaplain-General. The senior Roman Catholic Chaplain (usually a CF1) is sometimes ranked as a monsignor.

List of Chaplains General

Deputy Chaplain General

Order of precedence

Some notable Army chaplains

 Michael Adler DSO
 William Addison VC
 Edward Armstrong Bennett MC
 Harry Blackburne DSO MC
 A. C. Bouquet
 Tubby Clayton (Founder, Toc H)
 Francis Lyon Cohen
 David Cooper
 Cox Edghill
 Willie Doyle MC
 Francis Gleeson
 Samuel Leighton Green MC
 Alexander Macdonell
 Theodore Hardy VC DSO MC
 James Harkness KCVO CB OBE
 Hugh Hornby MC
 Rupert Inglis, former England rugby international
 Geoffrey Studdert Kennedy MC ("Woodbine Willie")
 Noel Mellish VC
 George Smith (Padre at Rorke's Drift)
 Neville Talbot
 Maurice Wood

Gallery

See also

Royal Air Force Chaplains Branch
Royal Navy Chaplaincy Service
Bishop to the Forces (Anglican)
Bishopric of the Forces (Roman Catholic)
Military chaplain#United Kingdom
International Military Chiefs of Chaplains Conference
Religion in the United Kingdom
Toc H
Military archdeacons
:Category:Royal Army Chaplains' Department officers

Footnotes

Sources

Further reading
 Bergen, Doris. L., (ed), 2004. The Sword of the Lord: Military Chaplains from the First to the Twenty-First Century. University of Notre Dame Press 
 Kennedy, Geoffrey Anketell Studdert The Unutterable Beauty, 
 Loudon, Stephen H. Chaplains in Conflict. The Role of Army Chaplains since 1914. Avon Books, London: 1996. 
 MacDonald, David R. Padre E. C. Crosse and 'the Devonshire Epitaph': The Astonishing Story of One Man at the Battle of the Somme (with Antecedents to Today's 'Just War' Dialogue), 
 McLaren, Stuart John (ed.) Somewhere in Flanders. A Norfolk Padre in the Great War. The War Letters of the Revd Samuel Frederick Leighton Green MC, Army Chaplain 1916–1919. The Larks Press, Norfolk, UK (www.booksatlarkspress.co.uk): 2005. 
 Montell, Hugh (2002) A Chaplain's War. The Story of Noel Mellish VC, MC. 
 O'Rahilly, Alfred The Padre of Trench Street (about Jesuit Father William Doyle), 
 Purcell, William Woodbine Willie. An Anglican Incident. Being some account of the life and times of Geoffrey Anketell Studdert Kennedy, poet, prophet, seeker after truth, 1883–1929. London: 1962
 Smyth, Brigadier The Rt Hon. Sir John, Bt, VC, MC In This Sign Conquer. The Story of the Army Chaplains. London: 1968
 Teonge, Henry The Diary of Henry Teonge Chaplain on Board HM’s Ships Assistance, Bristol and Royal Oak 1675–1679. Edited by Sir E. Denison Ross and Eileen Power. London: Routledge, [1927] 2005.
 Thornton, Sybil "Buddhist Chaplains in the Field of Battle" in Buddhism in Practice, ed. Donald S. Lopez, Jr. (Princeton: Princeton University Press, 1995)
 Wilkinson, Alan The Church of England and the First World War. SPCK, London: 1978, reprinted by SCM, London: 1996. 
Padres at War: Army chaplains bring comfort to the front line. Royal Army Chaplains' Department webpage. British Army official website.

External links
 
 Royal Army Chaplains' Department at the National Army Museum, Chelsea

 
British administrative corps
Military chaplains
Religion in the military
Religion in the United Kingdom
Military units and formations established in 1796
1796 establishments in Great Britain